That's the Way It Is is a live album by American jazz vibraphonist Milt Jackson featuring performances recorded at Shelly's Manne Hole in 1969 for the Impulse! label.

Reception
The Allmusic review awarded the album 3 stars.".

Track listing
 "Frankie and Johnny" (Traditional) - 6:43 
 "Here's That Rainy Day" (Johnny Burke, Jimmy Van Heusen) - 7:45 
 "Wheelin' and Dealin'" (Teddy Edwards) - 4:32 
 "Blues In Bassment" (Ray Brown) - 7:15 
 "Tenderly" (Walter Gross, Jack Lawrence) - 8:44 
 "That's The Way It Is" (Monty Alexander) - 7:22 
Recorded at Shelly's Manne-Hole in Hollywood, California on August 1 & 2, 1969

Personnel
Milt Jackson – vibes
Teddy Edwards - tenor saxophone   
Monty Alexander – piano
Ray Brown – bass
Dick Berk – drums

References 

Impulse! Records live albums
Milt Jackson albums
1969 live albums
Albums recorded at Shelly's Manne-Hole